The Black River is a river in Cape Town, South Africa. It is a tributary of the Salt River together with the Liesbeeck River and the Elsieskraal River. It rises in Arderne Gardens and flows underground initially beneath Main Road and the railway line, before continuing as a canal through Claremont and Rondebosch, then uncanalised through Mowbray, Observatory and Maitland after which it joins the Salt River. Its catchment is part of the Central Management Area of the City of Cape Town and the city has canalised 55% of the river.

See also 
List of rivers of South Africa
List of estuaries of South Africa

References

External links
State of Rivers Report: Greater Cape Town Rivers 2005

Rivers of the Western Cape